The 7th Fighter Aviation Division is a unit of the Chinese People's Liberation Army Air Force.  It is headquartered at Zhangjiakou Air Base in the Beijing Military Region.  The unit is equipped with the Chengdu J-7 and Shenyang J-11 fighters.  PLA-AF fighter divisions generally consist of about 17,000 personnel and 70-120 aircraft.

It was originally formed in September 1950 at Dongfeng, Jilin Province, as a fighter unit with the 19th and 21st Regiments.

It was assigned soon after formation to the air force component of the Chinese People's Volunteers as a mixed MiG-9/MiG-15 fighter unit. It did not enter combat in Korea and returned to Northern China in November 1951.

References

Bibliography

External links
 PLAAF Order of Battle at Scramble Magazine - Dutch Aviation Society

Aviation Divisions of the People's Liberation Army
Military units and formations established in 1950
1950 establishments in China